Atelurinae is a subfamily of primitive insects belonging to the order Zygentoma. Once considered an independent family, it is now treated as a subfamily within the Nicoletiidae. They are generally found in association with ants or termites, living as inquilines in the hosts' nests. They are typically small, tear-drop or sub-ovoid in body shape, light yellow in color and lacking eyes.  The subfamily is quite diverse, with more than 140 described species in about 70 genera; many of the genera are monotypic.

References 

Insect subfamilies